91 Aquarii is the Flamsteed designation for a triple star system in the equatorial constellation of Aquarius. It also bears the Bayer designation Psi1 Aquarii. It is visible to the naked eye with an apparent visual magnitude of +4.248. An extrasolar planet is known to orbit the main star.

Stellar system
91 Aquarii is a triple star system. The primary component, 91 Aqr A, is a giant star with a stellar classification of K1 III. This is an evolved star with 138% of the Sun's mass that has expanded to over 10 times the size of the Sun. It is radiating 54 times the Sun's luminosity from its outer envelope at an effective temperature of 4,730 K. This gives it the orange-hued glow of a K-type star.

The primary shares a common proper motion with two others stars, 91 Aqr B and C, suggesting that they are physically connected. The latter pair form a binary system located at an angular separation of 52 arcseconds from the primary. They are 10th magnitude stars separated by 0.3 arcseconds from each other.

Because it lies near the same line of sight, the binary star system CCDM J23159-0905DE was listed to belong to the 91 Aquarii system according to the CCDM catalogue. However, it is listed as physically unconnected in the WDS catalogue and the pair have a different proper motion than 91 Aquarii. CCDM J23159-0905DE has two components, the 13th magnitude CCDM J23159-0905D 80.4 arcseconds from 91 Aquarii, and the 14th magnitude CCDM J23159-0905E 19.7 arcseconds from 91 Aquarii.

Planetary system
In 2003, the discovery of an extrasolar planet orbiting 91 Aquarii A was announced. Despite controversy, the exoplanet was confirmed again on Jan 03, 2011 by the Conference " Planetary Systems Beyond the Main Sequence", Bamberg 2010 (Quirrenbach et al.). The 91 Aquarii b is listed as "confirmed" as in 2020.

See also
 Aldebaran
 Iota Draconis
 Pollux (star)

References

External links
 
 
 
 Extrasolar Planets Encyclopaedia: 91 Aqr
 Orbit simulation
 Image Psi Aquarii
 sky-map.org/
 planetquest.jpl.nasa.gov

Aquarius (constellation)
Aquarii, Psi1
Aquarii, 091
219449
8841
114855
Planetary systems with one confirmed planet
Psi1 Aquarii A
3
3
Durchmusterung objects
0893.2